Kimblesworth is a relatively small village in County Durham, England. It is situated between Durham and Chester-le-Street. The appropriate civil parish is Kimblesworth and Plawsworth. The population of this parish at the 2011 Census was 1,614.

It is home to Kimblesworth Cricket club, who due to financial reasons now play in the North East Durham cricket league.

References

External links

Villages in County Durham